Tarry is a surname. Notable people with the surname include:

 Chris Tarry (born 1970), a Canadian guitarist
 Ellen Tarry (1906–2008), African-American journalist, author and centenarian
 Gaston Tarry (1843–1913), a French mathematician
 Michael Tarry (died 2013), a Canadian popular singer
 Sam Tarry (born 1982), a British politician
 Sasura Hussein Tarry (elected 2007), a Kenyan politician

See also
 McCallum and Tarry (formed 1999), an artistic combination
 Prouhet–Tarry–Escott problem, in mathematics 
 Tarry, a minor planet
 Tarry Flynn, a novel by Patrick Kavanagh
 Tarry Park, Indiana, an unincorporated community
 Tarry point, in geometry, named after Gaston Tarry
 Tarry v Ashton, an English court case